San Rafael is a city in the southern region of the Mendoza Province, Argentina. With more than 118,000 inhabitants, it is the largest city in and the seat of San Rafael Department.

The city is located 240 km from the provincial capital and 990 km from the federal capital.  Natural attractions in the area include the Diamante River, which flows through the city, the rapids-strewn Atuel River just south and Lake Los Reyunos, 20 km (12 mi) west of San Rafael.

History 

Spanish expeditions led by Francisco de Villagra from what today is Chile first surveyed the area in 1551 and, finding a well-established agricultural Coquimbo and Diaguita cultures, they rapidly subdued the existing peoples and expropriated the land.  Displaced Pehuenches revolted, however, and repeated attacks led to an 1804 treaty signed by Viceroy Rafael de Sobremonte whereby the Pehuenches ceded land to colonial authorities. The construction of Fort San Rafael del Diamante and its completion on 2 April 1805 marked the formal establishment of San Rafael.

San Rafael remained relatively isolated from the rest of the country, long after independence in 1816. The area's agricultural potential and strategic location were eventually brought to the federal government's attention. In 1871, civil engineer Julio Balloffet was commissioned to oversee the development of San Rafael.  His efforts were centered around needed public works, among which were civic buildings, schools, plazas, a hospital, cathedral and irrigation works.  The irrigation canals were accompanied by an agricultural laboratory and a panel of agronomists and, by 1900, the San Rafael area fruit orchards had attracted a sizable contingent of Italian and French immigrants.

This sudden prosperity led to San Rafael's formal designation as department seat in 1903 and, that November, the expanding railways reach the city.  The railways led to the local development of food processing industries, as well as to the town's designation as a "city" in 1922.  The torrential Atuel and Diamante Rivers facilitated the construction of a number of important hydroelectric dams in the area, bringing further prominence to San Rafael as an economic and tourist hub within southern Mendoza Province. The first, the Nihuiles Hydroelectric Dam, was inaugurated in 1953 on the Atuel River.  The facility, which generates around 1000 MWh annually (today nearly 1% of the entire nation's), also resulted in the creation of a 9000 hectare (35 mi2) reservoir, bringing with it growing recreational tourism into the area. A similarly important work, Los Reyunos Dam, was built on the Diamante River, south of San Rafael, and inaugurated in 1984  The city, since 1968, has also hosted auto racing competitions at its La Paredes Autodrome, including numerous ones for Argentina's prestigious TC 2000 touring car racing competitions.

Distances to other parts of the country 
Federal Capital 990 km
Cordoba (Capital) 705 km
Neuquén (Capital) 605 km
Mar del Plata (Buenos Aires) 1205 km
Mendoza (Capital) 236 km
Rosario (Santa Fe) 860 km
San Luis (Capital) 273 km
Tucumán (Capital) 1290 km
Bariloche (Rio Negro) 1060 km

Climate

See also

Mendoza wine
TC 2000
Condor agate

Gallery

References

External links

 
 Diario San Rafael 

Populated places in Mendoza Province
Populated places established in 1805
Cities in Argentina
1805 establishments in the Spanish Empire
Argentina
Mendoza Province